Lucius Julius Iullus (  438–430 BC) was a member of the ancient patrician gens Julia.  He was one of the consular tribunes of 438 BC, magister equitum in 431, and consul in 430 BC.

Family
Lucius was the son of Vopiscus Julius Iulus, who had been consul in 473 BC, and grandson of the Gaius Julius Iulus who had been consul in 489.  His uncle Gaius was consul in 482 BC, and the Gaius Julius Iulus who was consul in 447 and again in 435 was his cousin.  He was the father of Lucius Julius Iulus, consular tribune in 401 and 397 BC.  The Sextus Julius Iulus who was consular tribune in 424 might have been Lucius' younger brother, or perhaps a cousin.

Career

Consular tribune
The year before his election, Rome suffered through a severe grain shortage, and in order to forestall famine, a wealthy plebeian merchant named Spurius Maelius, who had purchased large stores of grain, sold it to the people at a low price.  The patrician Lucius Minucius Augurinus, who was praefectus annonae, or president of the grain market, accused Maelius of conspiring to overthrow the state, and Lucius Quinctius Cincinnatus was nominated dictator to deal with the emergency.  Cincinnatus summoned Maelius to appear before him and answer the charges, and when he refused the merchant was cut down by Gaius Servilius Ahala, the magister equitum.  To the plebeians, the accusation and killing of Maelius was nothing short of the murder of someone who had come to their aid, and they refused to permit the election of consuls for the following year.

In place of consuls, three men were elected consular tribunes: Mamercus Aemilius Mamercinus, whom Livy calls "a man of high distinction", received the most votes, probably reflecting the confidence the plebeians had in his even-handedness, followed by Lucius Quinctius Cincinnatus, son of the dictator, presumably representing the aristocratic party, and Lucius Julius Iulus.  During their year of office, the Latin city of Fidenae, long dominated by Rome, gave its allegiance to the Etruscan Lars Tolumnius, King of Veii.  Four envoys were sent to the Fidenates to demand an explanation, and were murdered, ostensibly on the orders of Tolumnius.  The breaking of the alliance and murder of the Roman envoys prompted the Senate to declare war against Veii and its allies, although hostilities would not begin until the following year.  The Romans were victorious, and Tolumnius was slain in battle.

Magister equitum
Seven years later, as Rome was emerging from one of its periodic epidemics, word arrived from Rome's neighbors, the Hernici, that the Aequi and Volsci were rising in arms, and fortifying a position on Mount Algidus.  According to some of Livy's sources, the consuls, Titus Quinctius Cincinnatus Pennus and Gaius Julius Mento, engaged the Aequi and Volsci at Mount Algidus and were defeated.  Either because of this, or the general state of disarray at Rome, in which the consuls were in perpetual disagreement, a group of moderates urged the tribunes of the plebs to pressure the consuls to name a dictator.  The Senate was opposed to this plan, but even as they railed against the presumption of the tribunes to compel the consuls to take action or face imprisonment, Quinctius and Mento preferred to throw in their lot with the people than with the Senate.

Predictably, the consuls could not agree on a candidate, and so the choice fell to Quinctius by lot.  He nominated his father-in-law, Aulus Postumius Tubertus, who named Lucius Julius Iulus his master of the horse.  Postumius ordered the Latins and Hernici to raise troops, while he assembled a Roman army.  When all three forces were ready, the dictator marched for the enemy camp, leaving the Magister Equitum and the consul Julius to defend the city.  The battle was extremely fierce; the dictator was wounded in the shoulder, while his cousin, Spurius Postumius Albus, who had been consul the previous year, left the field when his skull was fractured by a rock.  The consul Quinctius lost an arm in the fighting, and Marcus Fabius Vibulanus, who in charge of the cavalry, had his thigh pinned to his horse by a lance.  But the Romans were victorious, and all of the surviving enemies except for their senators were sold into slavery.

Consul
In the following year, 430, Lucius was elected consul, together with Gaius Papirius Crassus, over the opposition of the tribunes of the plebs, who had sought to elect consular tribunes instead.  During their year of office, the Aequi sent a delegation to the Senate, requesting a treaty, and were granted an eight-year truce.  The Volsci were occupied by internal dissension, and so Rome was at peace.  The domestic harmony was threatened, however, when the censors, Lucius Papirius and Publius Pinarius, levied numerous fines, payable only in cattle under the terms of the Lex Aternia Tarpeia of 454 BC, thereby depriving numerous citizens of their cattle in order to enrich the state.  The plebeian tribunes intended to propose a law converting the fine from one that was literally pecuniary to one payable in money, a measure that the people greatly desired.  But when one of the tribunes informed the consuls of this plan, Lucius and Papirius anticipated the scheme by proposing the law themselves, thereby depriving the tribunes of what might have been seen as a victory over the patricians.

See also
Julia gens

Footnotes

References

Bibliography
 Titus Livius (Livy), Ab Urbe Condita (History of Rome).
 Diodorus Siculus, Bibliotheca Historica (Library of History).
 Marcus Tullius Cicero, De Republica.
 Barthold Georg Niebuhr, The History of Rome, Julius Charles Hare and Connop Thirlwall, trans., John Smith, Cambridge (1828).
 Dictionary of Greek and Roman Biography and Mythology, William Smith, ed., Little, Brown and Company, Boston (1849).
 T. Robert S. Broughton, The Magistrates of the Roman Republic, American Philological Association (1952).

5th-century BC Roman consuls
Magistri equitum (Roman Republic)
Lucius consul
Roman consular tribunes